In mathematics, the Weierstrass preparation theorem is a tool for dealing with analytic functions of several complex variables, at a given point P. It states that such a function is, up to multiplication by a function not zero at P, a polynomial in one fixed variable z, which is monic, and whose coefficients of lower degree terms are analytic functions in the remaining variables and zero at P.

There are also a number of variants of the theorem, that extend the idea of factorization in some ring R as u·w, where u is a unit and w is some sort of distinguished Weierstrass polynomial. Carl Siegel has disputed the attribution of the theorem to Weierstrass, saying that it occurred under the current name in some of late nineteenth century Traités d'analyse without justification.

Complex analytic functions
For one variable, the local form of an analytic function f(z) near 0 is zkh(z) where h(0) is not 0, and k is the order of the zero of f at 0. This is the result that the preparation theorem generalises. 
We pick out one variable z, which we may assume is first, and write our complex variables as (z, z2, ..., zn). A Weierstrass polynomial W(z) is

zk + gk−1zk−1 + ... + g0

where gi(z2, ..., zn) is analytic and gi(0, ..., 0) = 0.

Then the theorem states that for analytic functions f, if

f(0, ...,0) = 0,

and

f(z, z2, ..., zn)

as a power series has some term only involving z, we can write (locally near (0, ..., 0))

f(z, z2, ..., zn) = W(z)h(z, z2, ..., zn)

with h analytic and h(0, ..., 0) not 0, and W a Weierstrass polynomial.

This has the immediate consequence that the set of zeros of f, near (0, ..., 0), can be found by fixing any small values of z2, ..., zn and then solving the equation W(z)=0. The corresponding values of z form a number of continuously-varying branches, in number equal to the degree of W in z. In particular f cannot have an isolated zero.

Division theorem
A related result is the Weierstrass division theorem, which states that if f and g are analytic functions, and g is a Weierstrass polynomial of degree N, then there exists a unique pair h and j such that f = gh + j, where j is a polynomial of degree less than N. In fact, many authors prove the Weierstrass preparation as a corollary of the division theorem. It is also possible to prove the division theorem from the preparation theorem so that the two theorems are actually equivalent.

Applications
The Weierstrass preparation theorem can be used to show that the ring of germs of analytic functions in n variables is a Noetherian ring, which is also referred to as the Rückert basis theorem.

Smooth functions
There is a deeper preparation theorem for smooth functions, due to Bernard Malgrange, called the Malgrange preparation theorem. It also has an associated division theorem, named after John Mather.

Formal power series in complete local rings

Since  is again a complete local ring, the result can be iterated and therefore gives similar factorization results for formal power series in several variables.

For example, this applies to the ring of integers in a p-adic field. In this case the theorem says that a power series f(z) can always be uniquely factored as πn·u(z)·p(z), where u(z) is a unit in the ring of power series, p(z) is a distinguished polynomial (monic, with the coefficients of the non-leading terms each in the maximal ideal), and π is a fixed uniformizer.

An application of the Weierstrass preparation and division theorem for the ring  (also called Iwasawa algebra) occurs in Iwasawa theory in the description of finitely generated modules over this ring.

There exists a non-commutative version of Weierstrass division and preparation, with A being a not necessarily commutative ring, and with formal skew power series in place of formal power series.

Tate algebras

There is also a Weiertrass preparation theorem for Tate algebras

over a complete non-archimedean field k.  
These algebras are the basic building blocks of rigid geometry. One application of this form of the Weierstrass preparation theorem is the fact that the rings  are Noetherian.

See also 
 Oka coherence theorem

References

, reprinted in 

 reprinted by Johnson, New York, 1967.

External links 

Several complex variables
Commutative algebra
Theorems in complex analysis